Liolaemus bitaeniatus, the striped tree iguana, is a species of lizard in the family  Liolaemidae. It is native to Argentina.

References

bitaeniatus
Reptiles described in 1984
Reptiles of Argentina
Taxa named by Raymond Laurent